The men's skeet shooting event at the 2011 Pan American Games was on October 21 and 22 at the Jalisco Hunting Club in Guadalajara. The defending Pan American Games champion is Vincent Hancock of the United States.

The event consisted of two rounds: a qualifier and a final. In the qualifier, each shooter fired 5 sets of 25 shots in skeet shooting.

The top 6 shooters in the qualifying round moved on to the final round. There, they fired one additional round of 25. The total score from all 150 shots was used to determine final ranking. Ties are broken using a shoot-off; additional shots are fired one pair at a time until there is no longer a tie.

Schedule
All times are Central Standard Time (UTC-6).

Records
The existing world and Pan American Games records were as follows.

Results
28 athletes from 16 countries competed.

Qualification

Final

References

Shooting at the 2011 Pan American Games